The Scholarly Publishing and Academic Resources Coalition (SPARC) is an international alliance of academic and research libraries developed by the Association of Research Libraries in 1998 which promotes open access to scholarship. The coalition currently includes some 800 institutions in North America, Europe, Japan, China and Australia. 

Richard Johnson served as director 1998-2005. Heather Joseph became executive director in 2005.

History

The idea of SPARC was presented at the 1997 annual meeting of the Association of Research Libraries. Kenneth Frazier, librarian at the University of Wisconsin, proposed that attendees at the meeting develop a fund to create a new publication model for academic journals wherein many libraries contributed to that fund, and from that fund, the contributors would create new publications on some model which lowered the costs of all journals. As founding director, Rick Johnson led the establishment of SPARC in 2002 as a result of so many librarians expressing the desire for reform.

SPARC Europe was established with LIBER in 2001. David Prosser became director in 2002.

Starting in 2006 the SPARC Innovators Award has been given semi-annually to recognize an individual, institution, or group exemplifying SPARC principles.

SPARC has established itself as an international alliance of academic and research libraries working "to correct imbalances in the scholarly publishing system". Its focus is to stimulate the emergence of new scholarly communication models that expand the dissemination of scholarly research and reduce financial pressures on libraries. Action by SPARC in collaboration with stakeholders – including authors, publishers, and libraries – builds on the opportunities created by the networked digital environment to advance the conduct of scholarship. Leading academic organizations have endorsed SPARC. SPARC Europe Seal for Open Access Journals offers certification for journals choosing the CC-BY license (Creative Commons) and provide the Directory of Open Access Journals (DOAJ) with metadata on article level.

SPARC Author Addendum
SPARC publishes an addendum which authors may use to negotiate with academic publishers. The form provides a templated request by authors to add to the copyright transfer agreement which the publisher sends to the author upon acceptance of their work for publication. Authors which use the form typically retain the rights to use their own work without restriction, receive attribution, and to self-archive. The form gives the publisher the right to obtain a non-exclusive right to  distribute a work for profit and to receive attribution as the journal of first publication.

Endorsements

Founding organizations:
 Association of American Universities (AAU)
 Association of University Presses (AUP)
 Big 12 Universities Chief Academic Officers

Later endorsements:
 Association of College & Research Libraries
 Association of Universities and Colleges of Canada
 Australian Vice-Chancellors' Committee
 Canadian Association of Research Libraries
 Jisc
 National Association of State Universities and Land Grant Colleges
 Standing Conference of National and University Libraries

See also 
Open Access Scholarly Publishers Association, of which SPARC Europe is a founding member
Open Access
Open educational resources policy
Library publishing
Open Access Movement in India

References

Further reading

External links 

Open access projects
Scholarly communication
Organizations established in 1998
Articles containing video clips
Lobbying organizations in the United States
Political advocacy groups in the United States
Organizations based in Washington, D.C.